The 2020 UCI Road World Championships is the 93rd edition of the UCI Road World Championships, the annual world championships for road bicycle racing. It took place between 24 and 27 September 2020 in Imola, Italy. The event was originally planned to be held in the Aigle and Martigny area in Switzerland, but this was cancelled on 12 August in response to the ongoing COVID-19 pandemic.

No under-23 or junior races were contested at the Championships; however, under-23 riders were eligible to compete in the elite races.

Courses
The road races took place on a  course, starting and finishing at the Autodromo Internazionale Enzo e Dino Ferrari (a motor racing circuit). Heading out from the Autodromo into the Emilia-Romagna countryside, the course used two climbs with an average gradient of 10% separated by the town of Riolo Terme, before returning to the Autodromo. The men's road race would lap the course nine times, and the women's road race would lap the course five times.

The time trial events took place on a  flat course, starting from the Autodromo before turning at Borgo Tossignano to return to the finish line at the Autodromo. Both the men and the women raced on the same course.

Schedule
All times listed below are for the local time – Central European Summer Time or UTC+02:00.

Events summary

Medal table

Notes

References

Sources

External links

 
UCI Road World Championships by year
International cycle races hosted by Italy
World Championships
UCI Road World Championships
UCI Road World Championships